Excuse My Glove is a 1936 British comedy sports film directed by Redd Davis and starring Len Harvey, Archie Pitt and Betty Ann Davies. It was produced by Alexander Film Productions. It was shot at Elstree Studios with sets designed by the art director Andrew Mazzei.

Synopsis
A young stained glass-worker accepts accidentally a challenge to fight in a boxing booth at a fair.

Cast

 Len Harvey as Don Carter
 Archie Pitt as Bill Adams
 Betty Ann Davies as 	Ann Haydon
 Olive Blakeney as 	Aunt Fanny Stafford
 Wally Patch as Hurricane Harry
 Ronald Shiner as 	Perky Pat
 Arthur Finn as 	Madigan
 Vera Bogetti as 	Lucille
 Bobbie Comber as 	Bivex
 Don McCorkindale as Jonny Williams
 Tommy Farr as Tommy Farr
 Jimmy Wilde as 	Jimmy Wilde
 Harry Mizler as 	Harry Mizler
 Billy Wells as Billy Wells
 Dave McCleave as Dave McCleave
 Gunner Moir as Gunner Moir
 Walter Roy as 	Landlord
 Andre Lenglet as 	Andre Lenglet - French Heavyweight
 Pancho Villar as 	Pancho Villar
 Frank Hough as 	Frank Hough
 George Daly as 	George Daly
 Benny Caplan as Benny Caplan
 Maurice Strickland as Maurice Strickland
 Ted Broadribb as 	Ted Broadribb
 Jimmy Butler as Jimmy Butler
 Moss De Young as Moss De Young
 Syd Hulls as Syd Hull 
 Johnny Rice as Johnny Rice
 Matt Wells as 	Matt Wells
 Ian Fleming as 	Boxing Match Commentator 
 John Turnbull as 	Boxing Promoter

References

External links
 
 
 

1936 films
1930s sports comedy films
British black-and-white films
Films directed by Redd Davis
British sports comedy films
British boxing films
1936 comedy films
Films shot at Rock Studios
1930s English-language films
1930s British films